A riot is a form of civil disorder.

Riot may also refer to:

Film and television
 The Riot, 1913 silent short comedy film directed by Mack Sennett
 Riot (1969 film), a 1969 American drama film
 Riot, a 1996 American action film starring Gary Daniels
 Riot (1997 film), a 1997 drama television film
 Riot (TV series), produced by Fox Broadcasting Company
 Riot, a 2015 film with Dolph Lundgren
 Riot (2018 film), a 2018 Australian television film

Music

Bands 
 Riot V, formerly Riot, an American heavy metal band
 Ra Ra Riot, an American indie rock band
 RIOT, an electronic music group signed to Monstercat

Albums 
 Riot!, a 2007 album by the American rock band Paramore
 Riot, a 1984 album by  John Duncan

Songs
"Riot" (2 Chainz song), 2012
"Riot" (Bullet for My Valentine song), 2012
"Riot" (Mandy Rain song), 2014
"Riot" (Ola Svensson song), 2011 song by Swedish singer Ola
"Riot" (Rascal Flatts song), a song from the 2014 album Rewind
"Riot" (Three Days Grace song), 2006
"Riot" (XXXTentacion song), 2015
"Riot", a song by Dead Kennedys from Plastic Surgery Disasters, 1982
"Riot", a song from the 2012 mixtape Cosmic Angel: The Illuminati Prince/ss by Mykki Blanco
"Riot", a 2016 song by Seth Hills, released on Revealed Recordings
"Riot", a song by Christian rapper Tedashii from his album Blacklight
"Riot!", a song by Cher Lloyd from Sticks and Stones
"Riot!" a song by Earl Sweatshirt from his 2018 album Some Rap Songs

Record labels
 Riot Entertainment, an independent record label based in Wollongong, Australia

Video games
 Riot Games, an American video game company
 Riot-E, a bankrupt Finnish media company
 Riot, a subsidiary of Telenet Japan
 Riot (video game), a 2019 indie video game

Comics & novels
 Riot (DC Comics), the name of two fictional characters from DC Comics
 Riot, the name of two fictional characters from Marvel Comics
 Riot, a manga by Japanese manga artist Satoshi Shiki
 Riot (novel), an historical novel based on the 1909 Pressed Steel Car Strike

Information technology
 MOS Technology 6532 RAM-I/O-Timer (RIOT), an integrated circuit
 RIOT (operating system), open-source operating system for the Internet of Things
 Riot.im, an instant messaging software based on Matrix later rebranded as Element

Acronyms
 RIOT, an acronym for the Swedish university Royal Institute of Technology
 RIOT, an acronym for Rapid Information Overlay Technology tracking software created by Raytheon

See also